Ángel Guillermo "Bochy" Hoyos Bubbico (born 20 December 1983, in Córdoba) is an Argentine footballer who most recently played for Jacksonville Armada FC in the North American Soccer League. Hoyos was released by Jacksonville in November 2015.

References

External links
 Armada bio

1983 births
Living people
Argentine footballers
Argentine expatriate footballers
Expatriate soccer players in the United States
North American Soccer League players
Jacksonville Armada FC players
Footballers from Córdoba, Argentina
Association football midfielders
FC Barcelona Atlètic players
Expatriate footballers in Greece
Expatriate footballers in Peru
Expatriate footballers in Venezuela
Celta de Vigo B players
Talleres de Córdoba footballers
Palamós CF footballers
Atromitos F.C. players
Panserraikos F.C. players
Unión Comercio footballers
José Gálvez FBC footballers
Aragua FC players
Argentine expatriate sportspeople in Spain
Argentine expatriate sportspeople in the United States
Argentine expatriate sportspeople in Peru
Argentine expatriate sportspeople in Greece
Argentine expatriate sportspeople in Colombia
Argentine expatriate sportspeople in Venezuela